Xavier Marcos Padros is a Spanish Formula One engineer. He is currently the race engineer for Charles Leclerc at the Scuderia Ferrari Formula One team.

Career
Marcos Padros started his career in motorsport as a race engineer for the BNC Racing Team. He got his first taste of Formula One while working for the fledging HRT team as performance engineer from 2010–2012. After the team folded he joined Williams Racing as a performance engineer for Felipe Massa. Seeking a new challenge, Marcos Padros decided to move to the United States to become chief race engineer for the Nascar team Richard Childress Racing in 2015. Marcos Padros returned to Formula One with Scuderia Ferrari, first as a factory based race engineer for 2018 and then became the race engineer for Charles Leclerc when he joined the team in 2019 remaining with the Monegasque ever since. Marcos Padros is the voice that guides Leclerc.

References

Living people
Ferrari people
Formula One engineers
Spanish engineers
Year of birth missing (living people)